Serendibite is an extremely rare silicate mineral that was first discovered in 1902 in Sri Lanka by Dunil Palitha Gunasekera and named after Serendib, the old Arabic name for Sri Lanka. 

The mineral is found in skarns associated with boron metasomatism of carbonate rocks where intruded by granite. Minerals occurring with serendibite include diopside, spinel, phlogopite, scapolite, calcite, tremolite, apatite, grandidierite, sinhalite, hyalophane, uvite, pargasite, clinozoisite, forsterite, warwickite and graphite.

See also
List of minerals

References

Inosilicates
Triclinic minerals
Calcium minerals
Sodium minerals
Magnesium minerals
Iron(II,III) minerals
Aluminium
Minerals in space group 2